Paweł Mandrysz (born 1 December 1997) is a Polish professional footballer who plays as a winger for Polonia Środa Wielkopolska.

Club career
On 28 August 2020, he joined Sandecja Nowy Sącz.

References 

1997 births
Sportspeople from Szczecin
Living people
Polish footballers
Poland youth international footballers
Association football midfielders
GKS Katowice players
Ruch Chorzów players
Sandecja Nowy Sącz players
Polonia Środa Wielkopolska players
I liga players
II liga players
III liga players